This is a list of National Cadet Special Activities conducted by Civil Air Patrol as a part of its congressional missions (Emergency Services, Aerospace Education, and Cadet Programs). Below is a partial list of activities offered nationally during 2008:

Air Force Careers 
As the official auxiliary of the United States Air Force, CAP has access to USAF facilities and personnel. The Air Force sponsors several schools, each of which focuses on a different area of Air Force culture.

Air Force Pararescue Orientation Course 
In this physically demanding activity, Cadets work with actual Pararescuemen learning land navigation, wilderness survival, climbing and rappelling and other Pararescue-related skills. This course is often abbreviated PJOC.

Air Force Space Command Familiarization Courses 
Designed for Cadets with an interest in space-related careers, this course provides an in-depth look at the capabilities and responsibilities of Air Force Space Command. Cadets learn about missile operations, space command and control, space lift, and orbital mechanics. There are two locations offered for this activity. The first being Peterson AFB, CO which has a focus on space command and operations. In the past, cadets who attend the Peterson AFB location have visited Schriever AFB, the Air Force Academy, Lockheed Martin, and Cheyenne Mountain. The other location offered is Patrick AFB, FL. This location has a focus on launch operations based at the Morrell Operations Center and Cape Canaveral launch site.

Specialized Undergraduate Pilot Training Familiarization Courses 
A glimpse of the training that makes an Air Force pilot, this school includes heavy academics, flight facilities tours and simulator time. This course was previously known as the Air Education and Training Command Familiarization Course.

Aviation Careers

Aircraft Maintenance & Manufacturing Orientation Course 
Co-sponsored by Cessna, this activity shows aircraft construction and maintenance techniques. Students receive tours of the Cessna Aircraft factory.

Airline Careers Exploration 
A hands on activity where cadets learn about careers within the airline industry. Students work with pilots, air traffic controllers, mechanics and flight attendants to better understand how Airlines operate.

National Blue Beret Activity 

Participants help conduct EAA AirVenture in Oshkosh, Wisconsin, the world's largest airshow. This is a 'working vacation' and duties include aircraft marshaling, crowd control and ELT deactivation.

National Flight Academy (Powered & Glider) 
Cadets who are at least 14 years old for glider and 16 for powered are eligible for the week-long National Flight Academy (NFA). Here, cadets go through high intensity instructive training both on the ground and in the air. Academies for powered flight (operating CAP Cessna 172 models) and glider flight (operating CAP LET L-13 Blaník models) are separate, so students may choose to apply to and attend either or both.

Cadets are paired with instructors and take daily flight lessons based on lessons learned in daily ground school sessions, as well as nightly homework readings. In addition, students are required to be prepared for any emergency that may threaten the aircraft or crew.

The purpose of NFA is to guarantee 10 hours of quality flight instruction to the students. However, due to the high intensity training, most students, pending their instructors permission, will be given the opportunity to solo, or pre-solo in the case of gliders, the aircraft. Depending on the academy, anywhere from 50-80% of student will graduate with their solo rating.

EAA Air Academy 
In addition to orientation flight time, Cadets study the flight, weather, navigation and aircraft construction.

Space Camp 
Cadets participate in United States Space Camp, conducted at the United States Space & Rocket Center, this course focuses on space exploration, and features flight simulation, physiology, crew equipment and more.

Aviation Challenge 
CAP sponsors cadets to participate in the Aviation Challenge. This activity is not exclusive to CAP members.

Leadership Careers

Cadet Officer School 
Based on the Air Force's Squadron Officer's School, Cadet Officer School is CAP's keystone leadership school. Open to cadet officers, it is held at the Air University at Maxwell AFB and teaches critical thinking, active decision making, operational and strategic leadership, and air power theories, as well as relating the principles learned at the school into real life situations. This activity is prerequisite, along with RCLS, in order to promote to the grade of Cadet Lt. Colonel.

Civic Leadership Academy 
Held in Washington, D.C., this course explores the functions of American government and political processes.

Hawk Mountain Ranger School 

The Colonel Phillip Neuweiler Ranger Training Facility at Hawk Mountain, Pennsylvania, is the oldest continually operated school of search and rescue in the United States. This activity teaches basic and advanced SAR techniques, such as survival, rope work, first aid and leadership.

Honor Guard Academy 
This activity teaches Air Force Honor Guard techniques and provides instruction on creating an Honor Guard at a Cadet's home unit. Cadets are also taught military discipline and protocol of the type required by a Honorguardsman, as well as the four elements of the Honor Guard: the Ceremonial/Demonstration Element, the Colors Element, the Funeral Element and the Drama Element (which involves plays and skits promoting a drug-free lifestyle and depicting the consequences of abusing illegal substances).

National Emergency Services Academy (Commonly referred to as NESA) 
An in-depth SAR school teaching all aspects of the CAP Emergency Services mission. This school is organized into three branches, the National Ground Search and Rescue School, the Incident Command Systems School, and the Mission Air School. Each branch runs several schools each year within the two weeks NESA is in session.

IACE 

Perhaps the premier National Cadet Special Activity of the Civil Air Patrol, IACE is an opportunity for two weeks of international travel to countries around the world and meet cadets of other cadet aerospace organizations.

Technology Careers

Advanced Technologies Academy 
Cadets gain hands on experience with new technologies being employed by Civil Air Patrol.

Engineering & Technology Academy 
Cadets are introduced to several engineering disciplines by completing hands-on projects. Cadets mentor and learn from professors, NASA employees, or Air Force researchers.

Obsolete Activities

Air Force Weather Agency Familiarization Course 
For Cadets interested in meteorology, this provides a chance to work with members of the Air Force Weather Agency and see how weather is forecast and interpreted using state of the art equipment.

National Military Music Academy 
An academy based on military music offered from 2000 to 2006.
NMMA was for musically skilled cadets age 12 to 21 and seniors, adults over 18, who are or have been involved in active musical organizations or school music programs. Its objective was to provide music and leadership training and to assist CAP members in introducing a music program into local CAP units and community events, e.g. opening/closing flag ceremonies, protocol functions, Tap’s, memorial services, parades, etc.

While at NMMA, Cadets learned about military music and protocol by performing in and attending several events. The first week was devoted to learning about the musical heritage and preparing to participate in the Connecticut’s Deep River Ancient Muster Parade playing fifes, bugles and drums. Other performances were a local fireman’s parade in Arbutus, Md., the Korean War Veterans Armistice Day ceremonies conducted at the National Mall and Arlington National Cemetery. After the concert, the cadets marched down to the CAP Memorial Bench Marker at Arlington National Cemetery. On the lawn at Mt. Vernon, they also performed a concert and marched with fife, bugles and drums to George and Martha Washington’s grave to play Taps. Other event participation included practicing with the Maryland CAP band at the Bethesda Naval Hospital, sitting in with the U.S. Air Force band rehearsal at Bolling AFB and visiting the sites and museums around Washington DC. Cadets and senior members attended the Air Force Band summer concert series while at the Air and Space Museum. They also had an evening to visit Baltimore’s Inner Harbor.

References 

 cap.gov/ncsa

National Cadet Special Activities of the Civil Air Patrol